Melsbroek Air Base  is a Belgian Air Component facility in Steenokkerzeel,  northeast of Brussels, the capital of Belgium. It is located on the northern side of the same site as Brussels Airport, with which it shares runways and ground and air control facilities.

The 15th Air Transport Wing operates from Melsbroek Air Base with following types:
 Airbus A310 (retired)
 Airbus A330 (retired)
 Airbus A321
 Dassault Falcon 20
 Dassault Falcon 900
 Dassault Falcon 7x
 Embraer 135 & 145
 Lockheed C-130 (being replaced by A400M)
 Airbus A400M Atlas

History
The aerodrome was constructed by the German Wehrmacht during World War II. After the 1944 liberation of Belgium, Melsbroek was operated by the Royal Canadian Air Force and the Royal Air Force when it was known as B58 Melsbroek.

Operation Bodenplatte, the German aerial attack of 1 January 1945, hit Melsbroek hard. According to Emil Clade (leading III./JG 27), the AAA positions were not manned, and aircraft were bunched together or in lines, which made perfect targets. The attack caused considerable damage among the units based there and was a great success. The Recce Wings had lost two entire squadrons worth of machines. No. 69 Squadron RAF lost 11 Vickers Wellingtons and two damaged. Possibly all No. 140 Squadron RAF′s de Havilland Mosquito aircraft were lost. At least five Supermarine Spitfires from No. 16 Squadron RAF were destroyed. No. 271 Squadron RAF lost at least seven Handley Page Harrow transports "out of action". A further 15 other aircraft were destroyed. 139 Wing reported five North American B-25 Mitchell bombers destroyed and five damaged. Some 15 to 20 United States Army Air Forces (USAAF) bombers were also destroyed. Another source states that 13 Wellingtons were destroyed, as were five Mosquitoes, four Austers and five Avro Ansons from the Tactical Air Forces 2nd Communications Squadron. Three Spitfires were also lost and two damaged. At least one RAF Transport Command Douglas Dakota was destroyed.

After the war, Melsbroek replaced Haren Airfield as the Belgian national airport. That title is now carried by the Zaventem terminal on the same aerodrome, built for the 1958 world exposition. At that time, the existing terminal was taken over by the then Belgian Air Force.

When Trans European Airways existed, its head office was in Building 117 of Melsbroek Airport. When CityBird existed its head office was in Building 117D.

See also

References

Belgian airbases
Airports in Flemish Brabant
World War II airfields in Belgium
Military airbases established in 1940
Steenokkerzeel